Dierickx is a Dutch patronymic surname most common in Belgium and based on a short form of Diederik. People with this surname include:

André Dierickx (born 1946), Belgian cyclist
Henri Dierickx, Belgian sport wrestler
 (1929–2009), Belgian politician and academic
Marc Dierickx (born 1954), Belgian cyclist
Matijs Dierickx (born 1991), Belgian badminton player
Mike Dierickx (born 1973), Belgian DJ
Wine Dierickx (born 1978), Belgian actress

See also
Volcxken Diericx (fl.1570–1600), Flemish printmaker and publisher
Dierckx, surname of the same origin

References

Dutch-language surnames
Patronymic surnames
Surnames of Belgian origin
Surnames from given names